is a former Japanese motorcycle racer, who competed in the Grand Prix motorcycle championships between 1991 and 1998.

Biography 
His first appearance at the World Championship was during the 1991 Grand Prix motorcycle racing season, where he competed riding a Yamaha in the 250 cc class. In 1993 he won the All Japan Road Race Championship title in the 125cc class. A year later, he competed in the 1994 Grand Prix motorcycle racing season in the same class, this time for the Aspar Cepsa team with better results, finishing in twenty-sixth position overall.

In the 1995 and 1996 seasons he ranked 14th overall. In 1997, he had a podium finish at the German GP in thirteenth place overall. He retired the following season, finishing in sixteenth place.

Results 
Scoring system from 1993 onwards:

(key) (Races in bold indicate pole position, races in italics indicate fastest lap)

References 

1965 births
Sportspeople from Kyoto
Japanese motorcycle racers
Yamaha Motor Racing MotoGP riders
125cc World Championship riders
250cc World Championship riders
Living people